The 1976 Cork Junior Hurling Championship was the 79th staging of the Cork Junior Hurling Championship since its establishment by the Cork County Board. The championship ran from 3 October to 12 December 1976.

On 12 December 1976, Ballyhea won the championship following a 4-14 to 4-10 defeat of Glen Rovers in the final at Moore Park in Kilworth. It was their third championship title overall and their first title in 21 years.

Results

Quarter-finals

Semi-finals

Final

References

Cork Junior Hurling Championship
Cork Junior Hurling Championship